Scopula kashmirensis is a moth of the family Geometridae. It was described by Frederic Moore in 1888. It is found in India (Kashmir).

Subspecies
Scopula kashmirensis kashmirensis
Scopula kashmirensis gooraisensis Prout, 1935
Scopula kashmirensis quettensis Prout, 1935

References

Moths described in 1888
kashmirensis
Moths of Asia
Taxa named by Frederic Moore